Vuhliar is an urban-type settlement in Makiivka Municipality, Donetsk Raion of Donetsk Oblast in eastern Ukraine. Population:

Demographics
Native language as of the Ukrainian Census of 2001:
 Ukrainian 12.93%
 Russian 86.99%
 Belarusian 0.08%

References

Urban-type settlements in Donetsk Raion